Evidey is 2019 Indian Malayalam-language mystery film directed by K. K. Rajeev and produced by Holiday Movies, a joint venture among Jubilee Productions, Maruthi Pictures, and Prakash Movie Tone. The film stars Shebin Benson, Asha Sharath and Manoj K. Jayan, with story by Bobby-Sanjay, screen play and dialogues by Krishan C, and music by Ouseppachan.

The film was shot in Idukki, Kerala and Goa. It was released on 4 July 2019.

Premise

Evidey unveils the mystery of a missing man through the story of a woman and her family in an intense search.

Cast 

 Shebin Benson as Leen Zacaria
 Asha Sharath as Jessy 
 Manoj K. Jayan as Symphony Zacaria 
 Baiju Santhosh as S.I Saimon Tharakan 
 Shivaji Guruvayoor as Priest 
 Suraj Venjaramoodu as Satheeshan 
 Kunchan as Kabeer Kallayi
 Prem Prakash 
 Sunil Sukhada as Purushu
 Anaswara Rajan as Shahana

References

External links
 

2010s Malayalam-language films
2019 films
Indian thriller films
2019 thriller films